The 1908 Ohio State Buckeyes football team was an American football team that represented Ohio State University during the 1908 college football season.  In their third season under head coach Albert E. Herrnstein, the Buckeyes compiled a 6–4 record and outscored their opponents by a combined total of 118 to 92.

Schedule

References

Ohio State
Ohio State Buckeyes football seasons
Ohio State Buckeyes football